Syrians (Sūriyyīn) are an Eastern Mediterranean ethnic group indigenous to the Levant. They share common Levantine Semitic roots. The cultural and linguistic heritage of the Syrian people is a blend of both indigenous elements and the foreign cultures that have come to inhabit the region of Syria over the course of thousands of years. The mother tongue of most Syrians is Levantine Arabic, which came to replace the former mother tongue, Aramaic, following the Muslim conquest of the Levant in the 7th century. The conquest led to the establishment of the Caliphate under successive Arab dynasties, who, during the period of the later Abbasid Caliphate, promoted the use of the Arabic language. A minority of Syrians have retained Aramaic which is still spoken in its Eastern and Western dialects. In 2018, the Syrian Arab Republic had an estimated population of 19.5 million, which includes, aside from the aforementioned majority, the largest Syrian ethnic minority the Kurds, as well as Assyrians, Turks, Armenians and others.

Before the Syrian Civil War, there was quite a large Syrian diaspora, who had immigrated to North America (United States and Canada), European Union member states (including Sweden, France, and Germany), South America (mainly in Brazil, Argentina, Venezuela, and Chile), the West Indies, Africa, Australia, and New Zealand. Six million refugees of the Syrian Civil War also live outside Syria now, mostly in Turkey, Jordan, and Lebanon.

Etymology

Applications of the name
The Greeks used the terms "Syrian" and "Assyrian" interchangeably to indicate the indigenous Arameans, Assyrians and other inhabitants of the Levant and Mesopotamia, Herodotus considered "Syria" west of the Euphrates. Starting from the 2nd century BC onwards, ancient writers referred to the ruler of the Seleucid Empire as the King of Syria or King of the Syrians. The Seleucids designated the districts of Seleucis and Coele-Syria explicitly as Syria and ruled the Syrians as indigenous populations residing west of the Euphrates (Aramea) in contrast to Assyrians who had their native homeland in Mesopotamia east of the Euphrates. However, the interchangeability between Assyrians and Syrians persisted during the Hellenistic period.

In one instance, the Ptolemaic dynasty of the Hellenistic kingdom of Egypt applied the term "Syrian Village" as the name of a settlement in Fayoum. The term "Syrians" is under debate whether it referred to Jews or to Arameans, as the Ptolemies referred to all peoples originating from Modern Syria and Palestine as Syrian.

The term Syrian was imposed upon Arameans of modern Levant by the Romans. Pompey created the province of Syria, which included modern-day Lebanon and Syria west of the Euphrates, framing the province as a regional social category with civic implications. Plutarch described the indigenous people of this newly created Roman province as "Syrians", so did Strabo, who observed that Syrians resided west of the Euphrates in Roman Syria, and he explicitly mentions that those Syrians are the Arameans, whom he calls Aramaei, indicating an extant ethnicity. Posidonius noted that the people called Syrians by the Greeks refer to themselves as Arameans.

In his book The Great Roman-Jewish War, Josephus, a Hebrew native to the Levant, mentioned the Syrians as the non-Hebrew, non-Greek indigenous inhabitants of Syria.

The Arabs called the Greater Syria region al-Sham. The national and ethnic designation "Syrian" is one that has been reused, accepted and espoused by the Syrian people since the advent of the modern national identity, which emanated from Europe and began with the culmination of the Napoleonic Wars of the early 1800s.

History
 
Syrians are of diverse origins; the main influence came from ancient Semitic peoples of the Levant such as the Arameans, as well as populations from Mesopotamia and modern-day Arabia, with additional Greco-Roman influence. Ancient Syria of the first millennium BC was dominated by the Aramaeans; they originated in the Northern Levant as a continuum of the Bronze Age populations of Syria, possibly being derived from the same population as ancient Phoenician or Canaanite peoples. The Seleucids ruled the Syrians as a conquered nation; Syrians were not assimilated into Greek communities, and many local peasants were exploited financially as they had to pay rent for Greek landlords. Outside Greek colonies, the Syrians lived in districts governed by local temples that did not use the Greek civic system of poleis and colonies. The situation changed after the Roman conquest in 64 BC; Syrians obtained the citizenship of Greek poleis, and the line separating between the colonists and the colonized blurred. The idioms Syrian and Greek were used by Rome to denote civic societies instead of separate ethnic groups.

The Aramaeans assimilated the earlier Greek and Roman populations through their language; combined with the religion of Christianity, most of the inhabitants turned into Syrians (Aramaeans). Islam and the Arabic language had a similar effect where the Aramaeans themselves became Arabs regardless of their ethnic origin following the Muslim conquest of the Levant. The presence of Arabs in Syria is recorded since the 9th century BC, and Roman period historians, such as Strabo, Pliny the Elder, and Ptolemy, reported that Arabs inhabited many parts of Syria. What antiquity's writers meant by the designation "Arab" is debated; the historian Michael Macdonald suggested that the term is an ethnic designation based on an "ill-defined complex of linguistic and cultural characteristics", while according to academic consensus, "Arab", in addition to it being an ethnic name, had a social meaning describing a nomadic way of life. The urheimat of the Arab ethnos is unclear; the traditional 19th century theory locates this in the Arabian Peninsula, while some modern scholars, such as David Frank Graf, note that the epigraphic and archaeological evidence render the traditional theory inadequate to explain the Arabs' appearance in Syria. The Arabs mentioned in Syria by Greco-Roman writers were assimilated into the newly formed "Greco–Aramaean culture" that dominated the region, and the texts they produced were written in Greek and Aramaic. Old Arabic, the precursor of Classical Arabic, was not a literary language; its speakers used Aramaic for writing purposes.

Arabization
On the eve of the Rashidun Caliphate conquest of the Levant, 634 AD, Syria's population mainly spoke Aramaic as the Lingua franca, while Greek was the language of administration. Arabization and Islamization of Syria began in the 7th century, and it took several centuries for Islam, the Arab identity, and language to spread; the Arabs of the caliphate did not attempt to spread their language or religion in the early periods of the conquest, and formed an isolated aristocracy. The Arabs of the caliphate accommodated many new tribes in isolated areas to avoid conflict with the locals; caliph Uthman ordered his governor, Muawiyah I, to settle the new tribes away from the original population. Syrians who belonged to Monophysitic denominations welcomed the Muslim Arabs as liberators.

The Abbasids in the eighth and ninth century sought to integrate the peoples under their authority, and the Arabization of the administration was one of their methods. Arabization gained momentum with the increasing numbers of Muslim converts from Christianity; the ascendancy of Arabic as the formal language of the state prompted the cultural and linguistic assimilation of Syrian converts. Some of those who remained Christian also became arabized, while others stayed Aramean, it was probably during the Abbasid period in the ninth century that Christians adopted Arabic as their first language; the first translation of the gospels into Arabic took place in this century. Many historians, such as Claude Cahen and Bernard Hamilton, proposed that the Arabization of Christians was completed before the First Crusade. By the thirteenth century, the Arabic language achieved complete dominance in the region, with many of its speakers having become Arabs.Those who retained the Aramaic language are divided among two groups:
The Eastern Aramaic Syriac-speaking group, followers of the West Syriac Rite of the Syriac Orthodox Church and the Syrian Catholic Church; they kept the pre-Islamic Syrian (Syriac) identity throughout the ages, asserting their culture in face of the Arab dominance. Linguists, such as Carl Brockelmann and François Lenormant, suggested that the rise of the Garshuni writing (using Syriac alphabet to write Arabic) was an attempt by the Syriac Orthodox to assert their identity. Syriac is still the liturgical language for most of the different Syriac churches in Syria. The Syriac Orthodox Church was known as the Syrian Orthodox Church until 2000, when the holy synod decided to rename it to avoid any nationalistic connotations; the Catholic Church still has "Syrian" in its official name.
The Western Neo-Aramaic-speaking group, that is, the inhabitants of Bakh'a, Jubb'adin and Ma'loula. The residents of Bakh'a and Jubb'adin converted to Islam in the eighteenth century (retaining their Aramean identity), while in Ma'loula, the majority are Christians, mainly belonging to the Melkite Greek Catholic Church, but also to the Greek Orthodox Church of Antioch, in addition to a Muslim minority, who speaks the same Aramaic dialect of the Christian residents. The people of those villages use Arabic intensively to communicate with each other and the rest of the country; this led to a noticeable Arabic influence on their Aramaic dialect where around 20% of its vocabulary is of Arabic roots. Bakh'a is steadily losing its dialect; by 1971, people aged younger than 40 could no longer use the Aramaic language properly, although they could understand it. The situation of Bakh'a might eventually lead to the extinction of its Aramaic dialect.

Identity
Besides religious identities, the Syrian people are split among three identities, the Arab, Syriac, and Syrian identities. Many Muslims and some Arabic-speaking Christians describe themselves as Arabs, while many Aramaic-speaking Christians and some Muslims prefer to describe themselves as Syriacs or Arameans. Also some people from Syria, mainly Syrian nationalists, describe themselves only as Syrians or ethnic Syrians. Most of the divisions in ethnic nomenclature are actually due to religious backgrounds.

Genetics

 
Genetic tests on Syrians were included in many genetic studies. The genetic marker which identifies descendants of the ancient Levantines is found in Syrians in high proportion. Modern Syrians exhibit "high affinity to the Levant" based on studies comparing modern and ancient DNA samples. Syrians cluster closely with ancient Levantine populations of the Neolithic and Bronze Ages. A Levantine ancestral genetic component was identified; it is estimated that the Levantine, the Peninsular Arabian and East African ancestral components diverged 23,700-15,500 years ago, while the divergence between the Levantine and European components happened 15,900-9,100 years ago. The Levantine ancestral component is the most recurrent in Levantines (42–68%); the Peninsular Arabian and East African ancestral components represent around 25% of Syrian genetic make-up.

The paternal Y-DNA haplogroup J1, which reaches its highest frequencies in Yemen 72.6% and Qatar 58.3%, accounted for 33.6% of Syrians. The J2 group accounted for 20.8% of Syrians; other Y-DNA haplogroups include the E1B1B 12.0%, I 5.0%, R1a 10.0% and R1b 15.0%. The Syrians are closest to other Levantine populations: the Lebanese, the Palestinians and Jordanians; this closeness can be explained with the common Canaanite ancestry and geographical unity which was broken only in the twentieth century with the advent of British and French mandates. Regarding the genetic relation between the Syrians and the Lebanese based on Y-DNA, Muslims from Lebanon show closer relation to Syrians than their Christian compatriots. The people of Western Syria show close relation with the people of Northern Lebanon.

Mitochondrial DNA shows the Syrians to have affinity with Europe; main haplogroups are H and R. Based on Mitochondrial DNA, the Syrians, Palestinian, Lebanese and Jordanians form a close cluster. Compared to the Lebanese, Bedouins and Palestinians, the Syrians have noticeably more Northern European component, estimated at 7%. Regarding the HLA alleles, Syrians, and other Levantine populations, exhibit "key differences" from other Arab populations; based on HLA-DRB1 alleles, Syrians were close to eastern Mediterranean populations, such as the Cretans and Lebanese Armenians. Studying the genetic relation between Jews and Syrians showed that the two populations share close affinity. Apparently, the cultural influence of Arab expansion in the Eastern Mediterranean in the seventh century was more prominent than the genetic influx. However, the expansion of Islam did leave an impact on Levantine genes; religion drove Levantine Muslims to mix with other Muslim populations, who were close culturally despite the geographic distance, and this produced genetic similarities between Levantine Muslims and Moroccan and Yemeni populations. Christians and Druze became a genetic isolate in the predominantly Islamic world.

Language 

Arabic is the mother tongue of the majority of Syrians as well as the official state language. The Syrian variety of Levantine Arabic differs from Modern Standard Arabic. Western Neo-Aramaic, the only surviving Western Aramaic language, is still spoken in three villages (Ma'loula, Al-Sarkha (Bakhah) and Jubb'adin) in the Anti-Lebanon Mountains by both Muslim and Christian residents. Syriac-Arameans in the northeast of the country are mainly Surayt/Turoyo speakers but there are also some speakers of Sureth Aramaic, especially in the Khabour Valley. Classical Syriac is also used as a liturgical language by Syriac Christians. English, and to a lesser extent French, is widely understood and used in interactions with tourists and other foreigners.

Religion and minority groups 

Religious differences in Syria have historically been tolerated, and religious minorities tend to retain distinct cultural, and religious identities.
Sunni Islam is the religion of 74% of Syrians. The Alawites, a variety of Shia Islam, make up 12% of the population and mostly live in and around Tartus and Latakia. Christians make up 10% of the country. Most Syrian Christians adhere to the Byzantine Rite; the two largest are the Antiochian Orthodox Church and the Melkite Greek Catholic Church. The Druze are a mountainous people who reside in Jabal al-Druze who helped spark the Great Syrian Revolt. The Ismailis are an even smaller sect that originated in Asia. Many Armenian and Assyrian Christians fled Turkey during the Armenian genocide and the Assyrian genocide and settled in Syria. There are also roughly 500,000 Palestinians, who are mostly descendants of refugees from the 1948 Israeli-Arab War. The community of Syrian Jews inside Syria once numbered 30,000 in 1947, but has only 200 today.

The Syrian people's beliefs and outlooks, similar to those of most Arabs and people of the wider Middle-East, are a mosaic of West and East. Conservative and liberally minded people will live right next to each other. Like the other countries in the region, religion permeates life; the government registers every Syrian's religious affiliation. However, the number of non-believers in Syria is increasing but there is no credible source or statistics to support this information.

Cuisine 

Syrian cuisine is dominated by ingredients native to the region. Olive oil, garlic, olives, spearmint, and sesame oil are some of the ingredients that are used in many traditional meals. Traditional Syrian dishes enjoyed by Syrians include, tabbouleh, labaneh, shanklish, wara' 'enab, makdous, kebab, Kibbeh, sfiha, moutabal, hummus, mana'eesh, bameh, and fattoush.

A typical Syrian breakfast is a meze. It is an assortment platter of foods with cheeses, meats, pickles, olives, and spreads.  Meze is usually served with Arab-style tea - highly concentrated black tea, which is often highly sweetened and served in small glass cups. Another popular drink, especially with Christians and non-practicing Muslims, is the arak, a liquor produced from grapes or dates and flavored with anise that can have an alcohol content of over 90% ABV (however, most commercial Syrian arak brands are about 40-60% ABV).

Notable people

Scholars
Iamblichus, a philosopher, mystic and mathematician
Porphyry, a philosopher and polemicist
Damascius, head of Plato's Academy: dubbed the "last of the Athenian Neoplatonists"
Syrianus, head of Plato's Academy and teacher of Proclus
Lucian, a satirist, rhetorician and pamphleteer
Posidonius, a polymath
Libanius, a teacher of rhetoric and sophist author
John Chrysostom, Syrian-Greek Church Father and archbishop of Constantinople
Thebit, a polymath who has a significant contributions in maths, astronomy and physics. He also worked in translation with Syriac, Greek and Arabic
Severus Sebokht, scholar and astronomer; the first Syrian to employ the Indian number system.
Al-Battani, who introduced a number of trigonometric relations; his Kitāb az-Zīj was frequently quoted by many other medieval astronomers, including Copernicus.
Ibn al-Nafis, polymath whose areas of work included medicine, surgery, physiology, anatomy, biology, Islamic studies, jurisprudence, and philosophy: mostly famous for being the first to describe the pulmonary circulation of the blood.
Ibn al-Shatir, an astronomer, mathematician and engineer. He worked as muwaqqit (موقت, religious timekeeper) in the Umayyad Mosque in Damascus and constructed a sundial for its minaret in 1371/72.
John of Damascus, a polymath and theologian
Meleager of Gadara, Syrian-Greek poet
Raphael of Brooklyn, of Damascene Syrian parents. The first Orthodox bishop to be consecrated in North America.
Hunein Maassab, professor of Epidemiology known for developing the Live attenuated influenza vaccine.
Shadia Habbal, an astronomer and physicist, played a key role in establishing the NASA Parker Solar Probe
Riad Barmada, orthopaedic surgeon and the former president of the Illinois Orthopedic Society
Fawwaz T. Ulaby, Professor of Electrical Engineering and Computer Science at the University of Michigan, received the IEEE Edison Medal in 2006.
Juan José Saer, Argentine writer. Lecturer at the University of Rennes and winner of the Nadal Prize.
Kefah Mokbel, FRCS. The lead breast surgeon at the London Breast Institute of The Princess Grace Hospital, professor of Breast Cancer Surgery (The Brunel Institute of Cancer Genetics and Pharmacogenomics) Brunel University London.
Oussama Khatib, a roboticist and a professor of Computer Science at Stanford University. Received the IEEE RAS for Distinguished Service Award (2013).
Dina Katabi, director of the Massachusetts Institute of Technology Wireless Center.
Malatius Jaghnoon, Epigrapher and founder of the archaeological society in Homs.
Jorge Sahade, founder of the University of Buenos Aires Institute of Astronomy and Physics of Space (IAFE) and the first Latin American to achieve the presidency of the International Astronomical Union (IAU).

Public figures and politicians
Septimius Severus, Roman emperor
Caracalla, Roman emperor
Avidius Cassius, usurper of the Roman Empire
Julia Domna, Roman empress
Julia Maesa, Roman empress
Elagabalus, Roman emperor
Alexander Severus, Roman emperor
Philip the Arab, Roman emperor
Gordian III, Roman emperor
Papinian, Roman jurist
Tiye, Great Royal Wife of the Egyptian pharaoh Amenhotep III (XVIII Dynasty of Egypt)
Tiberius Claudius Pompeianus, Consul of the Roman Empire
Leo III the Syrian, Byzantine emperor and founder of the Isaurian dynasty 
Odaenathus, Emperor of the Palmyrene Empire 
Vaballathus, Emperor of Syria, Egypt and Cappadocia 
Eutropia, wife of the Roman emperor Maximian 
Cassiodorus, Consul of the Roman Empire 
Carlos Menem (born July 2, 1930), former President of Argentina (1989-1999).
Carlos Fayt (1918-2016), former minister of the Supreme Court of Argentina (1983-2015).
Tareck El Aissami, former Vice President of Venezuela (2017-2018), serving as Minister of Industries and National Production since 14 June 2018.
Oscar Aguad, former Minister of Defense of Argentina.
Juliana Awada (born April 3, 1974), former First Lady of Argentina (2015-2019).
Rosemary Barkett (born 1939), was the first woman to serve on the Florida Supreme Court, and the first woman Chief Justice of that court. She currently serves as a federal judge on the United States Court of Appeals for the Eleventh Circuit.
Rushdi al-Kikhya, Syrian political leader.
Mustafa Bey Barmada, former General Governor of the state of Aleppo.
Haqqi al-Azm, former General Governor of the state of Damascus.
Shukri al-Quwatli, former president of Syria.
Nazim al-Kudsi, former president of Syria.
Hashim al-Atassi, former president of Syria.
Khalid al-Azm, former prime minister of Syria.
Saadallah al-Jabiri, former prime minister of Syria.
Fares al-Khoury, former prime minister of Syria.
Said al-Ghazzi, former prime minister of Syria.
Nureddin al-Atassi, former president of Syria. 
Nizar Kabbani, Syrian poet and prominent feminist figure in Western Asia and North Africa. 
Mitch Daniels, American politician, Governor of Indiana from 2005 to 2013 and President of Purdue University.
Queen Noor of Jordan, widow of King Hussein of Jordan, is of paternal Syrian ancestry.
Justin Amash, former U.S. Representative.
Omar Alghabra, Canadian politician, member of the House of Commons of Canada, and federal Minister of Transport.
Romeu Tuma (1931-2010), Brazilian politician.

Religious Figures 
Ephrem the Syrian, saint and polymath
Pope Anicetus c. 168, Bishop of Rome (Pope)
 Pope John V, Roman Catholic pope, 685-686
Pope Sergius I, Roman Catholic pope, 687-701
 Pope Sisinnius, Roman Catholic pope, 708
 Pope Constantine, Roman Catholic pope, 708-715
 Pope Gregory III, Roman Catholic pope, 731-741
Philip the Apostle, Christian saint and apostle
James the Great, One of the Twelve Apostles of Jesus
Simeon Stylites, saint
Andrew Stratelates, saint
Ananias of Damascus, Disciple of Jesus Christ
Cosmas and Damian, saints and physicians
Thaddeus of Edessa، was one of the seventy disciples of Jesus.
Luke the Evangelist, is one of the Four Evangelists
Sergius and Bacchus, martyrs and military saints
Lucian of Antioch, Christian martyr, presbyter and theologian

Business
Steve Jobs (February 24, 1955 – October 5, 2011), was the co-founder and former CEO of Apple, the largest Disney shareholder, and a member of Disney's Board of Directors. Jobs was considered a leading figure in both the computer and entertainment industries.
Jacques Saadé, was a billionaire with a net worth of $7 billion.
Rodolphe Saadé, billionaire with a net worth of $10.9 billion.
Jose Mugrabi billionaire with a net worth $5 billion
Ayman Asfari, Chief Executive of Petrofac.
Najeeb Halaby, American politician and businessman, former Deputy Assistant Secretary of Defense, former CEO and chairman of Pan Am and father of Queen Noor of Jordan.
Wafic Saïd, established the Saïd Foundation in 1982 and the Saïd Business School at the University of Oxford in 1996.
Mohed Altrad, French-Syrian businessman.
Arturo Elías Ayub, Mexican businessman, Director of Telmex.
Joseph Safra, Chairman of Banco Safra.
Ronaldo Mouchawar, CEO and co-founder of Souq.com
Sam Yagan, Internet entrepreneur best known as the co-founder of OkCupid, SparkNotes and Match.com.
Omar Hamoui, the founder of AdMob, has a net worth of $300 million.
Mohammed Rahif Hakmi, founder and Chairman of Armada Group

Entertainment

Leonardo Favio, Argentine actor, screenwriter and film director.
Flamma, considered one of the greatest Gladiators of his time.
Bob Marley, pop Singer
Mohamad Fityan (born August 1, 1984), musician and composer.
Hala Gorani (born March 1, 1970), news anchor and CNN correspondent.
René Angélil, Canadian singer and manager, the husband and former manager of singer Celine Dion.
Shannon Elizabeth, American actress and former fashion model. Of paternal Syrian ancestry.
Wentworth Miller, American actor, model, screenwriter and producer. Of partial maternal Syrian ancestry.
 Teri Hatcher, American actress.
 Jerry Seinfeld, American comedian.
 Bassam Kousa, Syrian actor.
Paula Abdul, American singer, songwriter, dancer, choreographer, actress, and television personality.

Sport
Ghada Shouaa, heptathlete, olympic gold medalist.
Philipp Stamma  was a chess master and a pioneer of modern chess. 
Yasser Seirawan, chess grandmaster and four-time United States champion.
Carolina Duer, Argentine boxer and former world champion.
Brandon Saad, American ice hockey player, of paternal Syrian descent.
Rocco Baldelli, American former MLB player.
Sami Zayn, professional wrestler.
Mojo Rawley,  professional wrestler

See also
History of Syria
Ottoman Syria
Arameans
Armenians
Arabs
Al-Shaitat
Assyrians
Greeks

Notes

References

Citations

Sources

External links

Syrian people, Every Culture
Photos and images of Syrian people, Syrian History - Online
Collections of images of Eastern Mediterranean people, including Syrian people, Mideast Image
Syrian people, Encyclopædia Britannica

 
Syrian diaspora
Semitic-speaking peoples
Articles containing video clips
Ethnic groups in the Middle East
Arabs